WHNS (channel 21), branded on air as Fox Carolina, is a television station licensed to Greenville, South Carolina, United States, broadcasting Fox network programming to Upstate South Carolina and Western North Carolina. Owned by Gray Television, the station maintains studios on Interstate Court (just northwest of Interstate 85) in Greenville, and its transmitter is located atop Slick Rock Mountain in Transylvania County, North Carolina ( southeast of Brevard).

History

Channel 21 license prior to 1979

WHNS operates on the oldest active television station license in the market, though the connection is indirect. WISE-TV launched in Asheville, North Carolina, on August 2, 1953. Broadcasting on channel 62, it was a primary NBC affiliate which also carried programs from ABC, CBS, and DuMont. ABC and DuMont moved to WLOS (channel 13) when that station signed on in September 1954. In 1967, the station changed its call letters to WANC-TV; the next year, it dropped its remaining NBC programming as its ownership brought a cable system to Asheville. WANC-TV moved from channel 62 to 21 in 1971, airing a limited amount of Christian television programming throughout the 1970s by simulcasting WGGS-TV in Greenville. The owner of WANC-TV, Thoms Broadcasting, reached a deal to sell WANC-TV to the owners of WGGS-TV in 1977; the Federal Communications Commission (FCC) forced the deal's demise in January 1979, saying that, as WGGS-TV could move to a transmitter site from which it could also serve Asheville, the ownership of two stations would be a wasteful use of spectrum.

Rebuilding channel 21
After the sale to Carolina Christian Broadcasting collapsed, Thoms lost the lease on the channel 21 antenna site, and the station went off the air. Thoms reached a deal to sell WANC-TV to Pappas Telecasting of Visalia, California, for $206,000 in June 1979. The sale became effective September 14, and twelve days later, on September 26, the call letters were changed to WHNS.

WANC-TV's signal had only reached Asheville and did not extend beyond the South Carolina state line. Pappas began the process of filing for new, much more powerful facilities on Slick Rock Mountain just a month after taking possession of the license. However, in 1981, the FCC designated its application for hearing. WGGS-TV had filed to move its transmitter to Caesar's Head in Greenville County, South Carolina, and the two applications were mutually exclusive for technical reasons. While WGGS-TV dropped its conflicting application, another problem had emerged: the proposed facility would not provide a strong enough signal to three percent of the city of Asheville, the city of license, because of shadowing by mountains. As a result, the FCC denied the initial application in 1982. Pappas appealed: the FCC review board found in Pappas's favor given the circumstances, finding that the company's push to restore channel 21's service to Asheville, limited choice of suitable sites, and good faith efforts outweighed the shadowing issues.

With approval from the FCC in hand, Pappas set out to rebuild the station. An existing building near Interstate 85 and Pelham Road, midway between Greenville and Spartanburg, was refitted to serve as the main WHNS studio base; delays in establishing more than a temporary presence in Asheville attracted protests from competitor WAXA-TV (channel 40) in Anderson. The delays were due to site work and sale negotiations.

WHNS began broadcasting April 1, 1984, promoting itself as the market's first general-entertainment independent station. (WAXA-TV, in comparison, did not reach homes in the North Carolina portion of the market.) It used one of the first circularly polarized TV antennas in service, broadcasting 3.5 million watts of power from Slick Rock Mountain. The station represented a $12 million investment in facilities and another $5 million in programs.

WHNS initially ran a schedule typical of an independent on the UHF band, consisting of cartoons, sitcoms, classic movies, drama series and select sporting events. It became the dominant independent station in the region, placing well ahead of WAXA in the ratings. Its original slogan, "It's Your Station" (which was later changed to "We're Your Station" in 1988) would also be used on then-sister stations KMPH-TV in Fresno and KPTM in Omaha, Nebraska.

Becoming a Fox affiliate
WAXA beat out WHNS for a charter affiliation with the upstart Fox Broadcasting Company, which launched in October 1986, even though WAXA had a considerably weaker signal (it was marginal at best in the North Carolina portion of the market and only appeared on Asheville cable systems upon affiliation) and less well-heeled ownership. However, in 1988, WAXA filed for Chapter 11 bankruptcy. Pappas, meanwhile, struck a group deal to affiliate KMPH, KPTM and WHNS with Fox: the three stations became Fox affiliates that September. WAXA never recovered from the loss of Fox programming and went off the air on August 31, 1989. After joining the network, WHNS abandoned its "TV-21" brand and changed its on-air branding to "Fox 21".

In 1990, Pappas sold WHNS to Cannell Communications (a broadcast group owned by television producer and author Stephen J. Cannell), earning a handsome return on its original investment; Pappas had successfully built up WHNS as a major player in the market. Cannell sold WHNS to First Media Television in 1994. On January 16, 1995, WHNS took on a secondary affiliation with the United Paramount Network (UPN), airing the network's programming during late-night time periods. First Media merged with Meredith Corporation in 1997. In October of that year, UPN's programming moved to WASV—which had been acquired by Pappas two years earlier in 1995. The station became exclusively affiliated with Fox as a result, only to add a secondary affiliation with Pax TV when that network launched on August 31, 1998; WHNS carried select programs from the network until 2003. In the fall of 2002, WHNS began branding itself as "Fox Carolina".

On July 24, 2003, Meredith received FCC approval to change WHNS' city of license from Asheville to Greenville to aid identification as a South Carolina station. Under the terms of the reallotment, the station was required to retain city-grade coverage of Asheville and to maintain its existing public interest obligations to that city.

In March 2009, the Meredith Corporation announced that WHNS and Nashville sister station WSMV-TV would have their master control operations moved to a new master control hub based out of the studio facilities of Atlanta sister station WGCL-TV, which began operations in the fall of 2009. Three other Meredith-owned stations, in Kansas City, Hartford–New Haven and Bay City, Michigan were later added to this hub in 2010. Meredith operates a similar hub at KPHO-TV in Phoenix to handle its stations in the Las Vegas and Portland, Oregon–Vancouver, Washington markets.

On September 8, 2015, Media General announced that it would acquire Meredith for $2.4 billion, with the combined group to be renamed Meredith Media General if the sale had been finalized. Because Media General already owns WSPA, and the two stations rank among the four highest-rated stations in the Greenville-Spartanburg-Asheville market in total day viewership, the companies would have been required to sell either WHNS or WSPA to comply with FCC ownership rules as well as recent changes to those rules regarding same-market television stations that restrict sharing agreements; CW affiliate WYCW (channel 62, now a CW owned-and-operated station) was the only one of the three stations affected by the merger that could have been legally be acquired by Meredith Media General either by forming a new duopoly with WHNS or maintaining its duopoly with WSPA, as that station's total day viewership ranks below the top-four ratings threshold. However, on January 27, 2016, Nexstar Broadcasting Group announced that it had reached an agreement to acquire Media General, resulting in the termination of Meredith's acquisition by Media General.

Sale to Gray Television
On May 3, 2021, Gray Television announced its intent to purchase the Meredith Local Media division, including WHNS, for $2.7 billion. The sale was completed on December 1. As a result, WHNS gained additional sister stations in nearby markets, including NBC affiliates WIS in Columbia and WMBF-TV in Myrtle Beach, CBS/NBC affiliates WRDW-TV and WAGT-CD in Augusta and CBS affiliates WBTV in Charlotte and WCSC-TV in Charleston. Gray now owns stations in every market covering South Carolina, as well as every North Carolina market except for the Greensboro−Winston-Salem and Raleigh−Durham−Fayetteville markets.

News operation
WHNS presently broadcasts 42 hours of locally produced newscasts each week (with eight hours each weekday and one hour each on Saturdays and Sundays). In terms of the number of hours devoted to news programming, it is the largest local output among the market's individual stations (WLOS, along with sister station WMYA-TV along with WSPA and sister station WYCW produce more hours of newscasts with their combined operations).

WHNS launched the first prime time newscast in the Greenville-Spartanburg market in September 1996, when CBS affiliate WSPA-TV (channel 7) began to produce a nightly half-hour newscast at 10:00 p.m. through a news share agreement. The program was produced from WSPA's main news set at its International Drive studio facility in Spartanburg and utilized WSPA's anchors and reporters; however, the newscast had a different on-air identity and graphics package than that seen on WSPA's newscasts. Meredith Corporation terminated the news share agreement in 1999, when the station began developing its own in-house news department; its news operation launched that fall with the debut of an hour-long 10:00 p.m. newscast.

The station eventually expanded their news offerings, adding a morning newscast.

On May 14, 2007, assignment editor Joe Loy was filming the aftermath of a traffic accident on a local highway when another accident occurred right behind him. Loy managed to tape that accident as a white van, which possibly went out-of-control because of a red pickup truck, spun towards and hit him, killing him instantly.

In September 2009, WHNS expanded its news programming into early evenings with the debut of a half-hour newscast at 6:30 p.m.

In 2011, WHNS began broadcasting its local newscasts in widescreen enhanced definition. The station ultimately upgraded its news production to high definition in 2014.

In September 2012, the station canceled their 6:30 p.m. newscast due to low ratings, but the following week launched an 11:00 p.m. newscast, airing Monday through Friday.

In October 2014, WHNS added a weekday hour-long 4:00 p.m. newscast, called The Four O'Clock News.

In 2017, the station added a 5:00 p.m. newscast and expanded their morning news from 4:30 a.m. until 9:00 a.m.

The station's 10:00 p.m. newscast is the highest-rated prime time newscast in the market in that timeslot (outranking the WLOS-produced newscast on WMYA-TV and the WSPA-produced newscast on WYCW) and its other newscasts are seen as competitive in the market.

Technical information

Subchannels
The station's digital signal is multiplexed:

From 2007 to 2015, WHNS carried a 24-hour local weather channel on its second digital subchannel, which was branded as "Fox Carolina 3D Radar". Through separate affiliation agreements involving Meredith Corporation and those networks' respective owners (NBCUniversal and Katz Broadcasting) that were signed within days of each other, on March 23, 2015, WHNS announced it would affiliate its second digital subchannel with Cozi TV and launch a third subchannel affiliated with Escape onto its digital signal that spring. On April 15, 2015, the 21.2 subchannel became a Cozi TV affiliate, while the new 21.3 subchannel launched as an Escape affiliate.  In June 2017, a fourth subchannel was added, launching 21.4 as a Bounce affiliate.

Analog-to-digital conversion
WHNS discontinued regular programming on its analog signal, over UHF channel 21, on June 12, 2009, the official date in which full-power television stations in the United States transitioned from analog to digital broadcasts under federal mandate. The station's digital signal relocated from its pre-transition UHF channel 57, which was among the high band UHF channels (52-69) that were removed from broadcasting use as a result of the transition, to its analog-era UHF channel 21.

Translators
WHNS operates five translators across the mountains of western North Carolina. These translators serve as low-power, limited-area repeaters that bring the network's signal to deep mountain valleys where the parent signal is blocked by the surrounding terrain. All digital translators use PSIP virtual channel 21.

Former translator
WHNS has one decommissioned translator.

Out-of-market cable carriage
In recent years, WHNS has been carried on cable systems within the Augusta and Columbia markets in South Carolina, and the Atlanta market in Georgia.

See also
Channel 17 digital TV stations in the United States
Channel 21 virtual TV stations in the United States

References

External links

WHNS Video Montage

HNS
Fox network affiliates
Cozi TV affiliates
Ion Mystery affiliates
Bounce TV affiliates
Grit (TV network) affiliates
Television channels and stations established in 1984
Gray Television
Former Meredith Corporation subsidiaries